The Plymouth Gran Fury is a full-sized automobile that was manufactured by Plymouth from 1975 to 1989. The nameplate would be used on successive downsizings, first in 1980, and again in 1982, through what would originally have been intermediate and compact classes in the early 1970s, all with conventional rear-wheel drive layouts. By the time Chrysler ended M-body production in December 1988 (1989 model year), they were Chrysler's last remaining rear-wheel drive cars, with a V8 and carburetor, a configuration used since the mid-1950s. Plymouth did not have another rear-wheel drive car until the 1997 Prowler roadster.

1975–1977

In 1975, the mid-size B-body Plymouth Satellite was restyled and renamed Plymouth Fury. As a result, the previous full-sized C-body Fury became known as the Gran Fury. Because the C-body Fury had been redesigned for 1974, the 1975 Gran Fury received few changes besides its new name. Top-of-the-line Gran Fury Brougham models were treated to a new grille and new single-unit headlight design; all Gran Furys would receive this for 1976.

This generation was available as a 2-door coupe, 2-door hardtop, 4-door sedan, 4-door hardtop, and 4-door station wagon. All models with the exception of the wagons rode on the  wheelbase shared with the Dodge Monaco. Gran Fury Suburban wagons rode on a longer  wheelbase that was also used by Monaco wagons and all full-sized Chryslers and Imperials. The 1975 Gran Fury was available in four trim levels: base (sedan and coupe only), "Custom" (all models), "Brougham" (coupe and hardtop only), and "Sport Suburban" (wagon only). Changes for 1976 were minimal. The 4-door hardtop body style was eliminated, leaving only coupes, sedans, and wagons. With this, sedans were now available in deluxe Brougham trim. Offerings were trimmed for the C-body Gran Fury's final model year, 1977. The mid-range Custom trim level was dropped, leaving only base and high-end Brougham coupes and sedans. 1977 Gran Fury wagons were available in either base Suburban or high-end Sport Suburban models. All full-sized C-body Plymouths were discontinued at the end of the 1977 model year, leaving the mid-size B-body Fury to soldier on as Plymouth's large car for 1978.

Sales of all of the Chrysler Corporation's C-body models for the 1974-1978 model years were considerably disappointing; the Plymouth Gran Fury was no exception. This is because 1973 introduction of the redesigned 1974 model year C-bodies coincided with the 1973 oil crisis. As gas prices skyrocketed, demand for gas-guzzling full-sized cars took a nosedive. C-body offerings decreased throughout the 1974-1978 design cycle. Imperials were the first to go after 1975. Plymouth and Dodge C-bodies were dropped after the 1977 model year. Chrysler C-bodies were discontinued after 1978. The discontinuation of the Gran Fury was followed by the discontinuation of the mid-size Fury after the 1978 model year. This huge gap in Plymouth's lineup left the compact Volaré as Plymouth's largest car for 1979. A redesigned downsized Gran Fury would return in 1980.

1980–1981

When the downsized "R-body" cars were introduced for 1979, a Plymouth version was not included, as the low-end Chrysler Newport was intended to fill this gap. Although the Newport achieved this, and 1979 sales were fairly strong, there was still heavy demand for a full-sized Plymouth model. So finally in 1980 the Gran Fury returned after a two-model-year absence.

This downsized Gran Fury was available only as a "pillared hardtop" 4-door sedan, this time based on the heavily restyled, but not re-engineered R platform, introduced in 1979 in response to redesigned Chevrolet and Ford models. The "new" R-body was heavily based on Chrysler's old mid-size B-body platform, introduced in 1962 and updated several times thereafter. Nearly identical to the concurrent Chrysler Newport, it was intended to satisfy dealer requests for a lower-priced full-size model but more importantly to fulfill fleet orders, primarily for police and taxi use.

The 1980 Plymouth Gran Fury was available in two versions, Base and Salon. Gran Fury Salon offered more standard features, including a vinyl-covered roof, higher-grade interior cloth, split-bench seat, chrome body-side trim, and deluxe wheel covers. Like its sibling, the Dodge St. Regis, the R-Body Gran Fury was very popular with fleet customers, especially police departments (by ordering the A38 Police Package coupled with a 185 bhp E58 360 cu in engine); both the Michigan State Police and the Ohio State Highway Patrol ordered substantial numbers of the cars. In light of this, the 1980 Gran Fury achieved the highest sales (18,750) of any R-body that year.

The second Generation Plymouth Gran Fury was short-lived, being discontinued midway through the 1981 model year along with the other R-body models due to slow sales. This can be mainly attributed to poor fuel economy, as well as its outdated platform. The 1981 Gran Fury was also the last true full-size car to bear the Plymouth name, until the brand's demise twenty years later.

1982–1989

In 1982, Plymouth downsized the Gran Fury again, this time sharing the mid-size M platform with the Chrysler Fifth Avenue (called Chrysler New Yorker/New Yorker Fifth Avenue for 1982 and 1983) and the Dodge Diplomat.  Now considered a mid-sized car, this generation Gran Fury was close to the exterior size of what was once the compact Valiant and Volaré but offered more interior room.  The M-body was in fact heavily based on the Volaré's F platform. Like its predecessor, the 1982 Gran Fury was introduced later than its Chrysler and Dodge siblings; the Chrysler LeBaron and Dodge Diplomat had used the M-body since 1977.

1982-1989 Plymouth Gran Fury shared the Dodge Diplomat's front and rear fascias. They were virtually identical with the exception of badging and exterior trim colors. 

Although available to retail buyers, the M-body Fury was very popular with police departments and other fleet buyers, primarily since the car was reasonably priced and had a conventional drivetrain with proven components that could withstand a good deal of abuse. 

This generation of the Gran Fury sold in respectable numbers. However, despite having the same base prices as the Gran Fury (just under $12,000 USD for their final year), the Diplomat always outsold it, sometimes by several thousand units each year. The Chrysler Fifth Avenue's total sales were always more than that of the Gran Fury and Diplomat, even though it generally cost about $6,000 USD more.

There was no one single reason that Chrysler decided to cancel the M-body 3 years ahead of what Lee Iacocca had promised to UAW Local 72 in Kenosha. Certainly, the design of the car was getting long in the tooth, but fleets appreciated the fact that most parts carried over year to year, and mechanics became very familiar with maintenance procedures. Build quality was always very good, and the price made them an excellent value for retail and fleet customers alike. 
However, shortly after the time production of the M body began in Kenosha in mid-1987, the economy collapsed after the stock market tanked.  Political pressure on Chrysler resulted in the new ZJ Grand Cherokee production being moved from Kenosha to Toledo. Also in 1988, newly elected city politicians that were decidedly less union-friendly took office. The Lakefront plant was also woefully outdated. Faced with either having to actually invest money in the M and L bodies at Kenosha, or killing them off, they dropped the M body and moved the L body to Mexico, throwing 5500 workers out into the street.
 
Changes over the years were relatively minor. The Slant Six was dropped after 1983. 1984 saw a few minor interior upgrades, and new exterior colors. 1985 brought an improved 2bbl 318, and a QJet to the 4bbl squads. 1987 brought a new steering wheel and stainless exhaust. Early '88 models got new interior and exterior colors, new alternators, and new radios. In mid-88, Chrysler began offering the new driver SRS, along with an improved engine cradle. Squads got gas-charged rear shocks. For 1989,many optional features became standard. Squads got a vacuum-controlled torque convertor lockup solenoid. 

The 1989 Fury would be the last V8-RWD Plymouth.  While Dodge offered the 1990 Monaco, and later the 1993 Intrepid, Chrysler never replaced the Gran Fury with any other large car in the remainder of the Plymouth brand's existence until its demise in the 2001 model year.

Canada
The car that later became the M-body Gran Fury was also sold in Canada from 1978 to 1989 as the Plymouth Caravelle, badged "Caravelle Salon" after the midsize front-drive Plymouth Caravelle was released in Canada for 1983. Although the Diplomat and LeBaron appeared on the market in mid-1977, the Caravelle was introduced in the fall of 1977 as a 1978 model. It was sold only by Canadian Plymouth dealers and was not available in the U.S., though the midsize front-drive car was offered in the U.S. market starting in 1985. In addition to the sedan body style, the Canadian Caravelle was offered in 2-door coupe and 4-door station wagon form through 1982. An interesting note is that for 1979, all M-body coupes were offered with 2 different roof treatments. The upscale trim model, called Caravelle “Salon”, had a more formal rear side window treatment with a tall, narrow rectangular shape, rather than the “triangle” shape of the standard model. This more formal coupe was only sold for one year.

References

Gran Fury
Rear-wheel-drive vehicles
Police vehicles
Full-size vehicles
Mid-size cars
Coupés
Sedans
Station wagons
1970s cars
1980s cars
Cars introduced in 1975
Cars discontinued in 1989